Gorgorhynchus is a genus of worms belonging to the family Rhadinorhynchidae.

The species of this genus are found in Central America, Australia.

Species:

Gorgorhynchoides valiyathurae 
Gorgorhynchus celebensis 
Gorgorhynchus celebesensis 
Gorgorhynchus clavatus 
Gorgorhynchus lateolabri 
Gorgorhynchus lepidus 
Gorgorhynchus medius 
Gorgorhynchus nemipteri 
Gorgorhynchus occultus 
Gorgorhynchus ophiocephali 
Gorgorhynchus polymixiae 
Gorgorhynchus robertdollfusi 
Gorgorhynchus satoi 
Gorgorhynchus tonkinensis 
Gorgorhynchus trachinotus

References

Acanthocephalans